This Is Who We Are may refer to:

 This Is Who We Are (Run Kid Run album)
 This Is Who We Are (As I Lay Dying album)
 "This Is Who We Are", The Millennium Group slogan (1999 TV)
 "This Is Who We Are", a song by Hawthorne Heights from the album If Only You Were Lonely
 "This Is Who We Are", the slogan of American news network MSNBC